Midway Airport  is a small, privately owned airfield in Babcock in the U.S. state of Michigan, located approximately  southwest of the city of Albion in Calhoun County.

Facilities 
 Runway 9/27: , surface: turf

References

External links 
Michigan Airport Directory:  

Airports in Michigan
Transportation buildings and structures in Calhoun County, Michigan